Ultimate Custom Night is a point-and-click survival horror video game developed and published by Scott Cawthon. It is the second spin-off game in the Five Nights at Freddy's series and the eighth game overall. Featuring over 50 characters from the previous games to fend off against, players can customize each antagonist's difficulty level to either facilitate or hinder survival. They can also customize their office room, and complete various challenges presented by the game.

Originally announced as DLC for 2017's Freddy Fazbear's Pizzeria Simulator, the game was later turned into a standalone release due to its size. It was released for free on Microsoft Windows on June 27, 2018, via Steam and Game Jolt. A mobile port for iOS and Android was released on April 28, 2020, and a console port for the PlayStation 4, Xbox One, and Nintendo Switch was released on April 30, 2021. A sequel, Five Nights at Freddy's: Help Wanted, was released on May 28, 2019.

Gameplay
The game allows the player character to choose from 50 characters from the first six main Five Nights at Freddy's games and FNaF World, and set their difficulty levels for the night from a minimum of "0" to a maximum of "20". During the night, the player must keep track of several mechanics, such as doors, ventilation systems, and air duct systems to avoid being attacked by the animatronics. The player can earn "Faz-Coins" to buy power-ups, plushies to stop certain animatronics, and a "Death Coin" to eliminate an animatronic of the player's choice from the current night. The player is also able to select the office setting, pick power-ups that may help them during the night, and select 16 challenges available to them. The objective is to survive from 12 a.m. to 6 a.m., with each hour in-game lasting 45 seconds. In the final release, 59 characters from the franchise were included, with some appearing without the player's choice. Of these extra nine, Dee Dee from FNaF World has the ability to randomly spawn and summon either a character that isn't currently active or one of six that are unavailable to the player. A new form of her named XOR being able to summon all of the extra six. An Easter egg involving using the Death Coin on Golden Freddy when he's the only active character on a night and set to "1" difficulty triggers a jumpscare from Fredbear, the earlier incarnation of Golden Freddy who had previously only appeared in minigames.

Plot interpretations
The player character is heavily implied to be William Afton, trapped in a purgatory-like state after the events of Freddy Fazbear's Pizzeria Simulator.

Development
In February 2018, after the release of Freddy Fazbear's Pizzeria Simulator, Cawthon announced in a Steam post that he would think about gaining help from larger publishers in making future games. In an edited version of the same post, he added that he would be developing an "ultimate custom night" add-on for Freddy Fazbear's Pizzeria Simulator, which, as revealed on his website, would have more than 50 animatronics from the entire series attacking the player. After realizing the size of the update, Cawthon decided to make it its own separate game. As he was programming the characters in the game, he would update the "progress bar" on his website, along with a brief description of the characters on a Steam post. The game was due for release on June 29, 2018. However, on June 22, in a Steam post by Cawthon, he revealed that he had planned to release the game on that day, but he had promised YouTuber Lewis Dawkins (a.k.a. "Dawko") that he would not release it before he came back from a cruise vacation, so he would wait until Dawkins returned from vacation on June 27 to release the game.

Reception 
Ultimate Custom Night received mostly positive reviews. Rock Paper Shotgun deemed the game "an intriguing mess", with PC Gamer calling it "a neat, customisable take on the classic survival horror formula".

References

External links 

2018 video games
Five Nights at Freddy's
Indie video games
Video games developed in the United States
Windows games
Single-player video games
Clickteam Fusion games
Android (operating system) games
IOS games
PlayStation 4 games
Xbox One games
Nintendo Switch games
Point-and-click adventure games
Video games about robots
Works about missing people
Video games set in hell
2010s horror video games